Paul Ruffner (October 15, 1948 – June 17, 2022) is a retired American basketball player who played in both the American Basketball Association (ABA) and the National Basketball Association (NBA).

Ruffner was born on in Downey, California.  He played basketball at Earl Warren High School in Downey, California.

A 6'10" center, Ruffner played college basketball for Cerritos College and then for Brigham Young University. He was selected for the Junior College Olympic Trials basketball team in 1968. The Chicago Bulls selected Ruffner in the second round of the 1970 NBA draft and the Virginia Squires selected him in the 1970 ABA draft.  Ruffner signed with the Bulls.

Ruffner played his rookie season, 1970–71, with the Bulls.  Ruffner played for the Pittsburgh Condors of the ABA in the next season.  After a year out of both leagues, Ruffner played during the 1973–74 and 1974–75 seasons for the NBA's Buffalo Braves.  Ruffner then landed with the Baltimore Claws but the team folded after a few preseason exhibition games.  Ruffner concluded his professional career in the final season before the ABA–NBA merger by appearing in two games for the Spirits of St. Louis during the 1975–76 campaign.

Paul married Lael Bower in 1970 and they had 6 children. Shannon, Bryon, Kellene, Brett, Erin and Brad.

At the conclusion of his basketball career, Ruffner and his family made Provo, Utah their permanent home.  He became a successful as a property owner and manager of student housing in Provo.  He continued to share his knowledge and expertise of the game through color commentary on KSL Radio which he did for 21 years.

Ruffner passed away at home on June 17, 2022 after a short battle with leukemia.

References

External links

1948 births
Living people
American men's basketball players
Basketball players from California
Buffalo Braves players
BYU Cougars men's basketball players
Centers (basketball)
Cerritos Falcons men's basketball players
Chicago Bulls draft picks
Chicago Bulls players
Pittsburgh Condors players
Power forwards (basketball)
Spirits of St. Louis players
Sportspeople from Downey, California
Virginia Squires draft picks